Nicolas Vaughan Travis (born 12 March 1987) is an English footballer who is the First Team Coach for Sheffield United.

Career
Born in Sheffield, South Yorkshire, Travis was signed by Chesterfield on loan in August 2007 until 31 December. He returned to Sheffield United in October, after suffering knee and ankle injuries.

In May 2009, with his contract about to expire, he agreed a free transfer to Australian A-League side Central Coast Mariners following a successful trial. He scored his first goal for the Mariners in a match against league leaders Gold Coast United in a 3–0 win. After his debut A-League season, Nicky Returned to Europe trialling with A.S.D Siracusa (Italy)

References

External links

Nicky Travis at Aussie Footballers
Nicky Travis profile at the Central Coast Mariners website

1987 births
Living people
Footballers from Sheffield
English footballers
Association football wingers
Sheffield United F.C. players
Chesterfield F.C. players
Central Coast Mariners FC players
English Football League players
A-League Men players
English expatriate footballers